The Cathedral Range is a mountain range immediately to the south of Tuolumne Meadows in Yosemite National Park. The range is an offshoot of the Sierra Nevada. The range is named after Cathedral Peak, which resembles a cathedral spire.

Geography
The range includes Cathedral Peak, Unicorn Peak, Eichorn Pinnacle, Echo Peaks, Echo Ridge, Matthes Crest, Rafferty Peak, Vogelsang Peak, Fletcher Peak and Cockscomb. The highest point in the range is Mount Florence, one of the most prominent peaks in the Yosemite high country. The highest peak in Tuolumne Meadows is Johnson Peak.

The range runs beside the two Cathedral Lakes, just one mile southwest of Cathedral Peak. Hikers can access the lakes and Cathedral range by the John Muir trail from the trailhead in Tuolumne Meadows.

Geology
The mountains were formed by glaciers carving out the granite material; also see Cathedral Peak Granodiorite. The tops of the peaks in the range were above the level of the highest glaciation, and are therefore un-eroded and distinctly spire-like; see nunatak.

References

Landforms of Yosemite National Park
Mountain ranges of Madera County, California
Mountain ranges of Tuolumne County, California
Mountain ranges of Mariposa County, California
Mountain ranges of the Sierra Nevada (United States)
Mountain ranges of Northern California